Víctor Pradas Gutiérrez (born 20 April 1999) is a Spanish professional footballer who plays as a goalkeeper for Logroñés.

Club career
Pradas was born in Logroño, La Rioja, and made his senior debut with CD Villegas on 9 April 2017, starting in a 1–3 Tercera División away loss against CD Anguiano. In August of that year, he moved to fellow fourth division side CD Varea, being initially assigned back at the youth setup.

In July 2019, after being a second-choice in the previous campaign, Pradas moved to UD Logroñés and was assigned to the B-team also in division four. He made his first-team debut on 5 December 2020, coming on as a second-half substitute for injured Rubén Miño in a 1–2 away loss against Rayo Vallecano in the Segunda División.

References

External links

1999 births
Living people
Sportspeople from Logroño
Spanish footballers
Footballers from La Rioja (Spain)
Association football goalkeepers
Segunda División players
Tercera División players
UD Logroñés B players
UD Logroñés players